The Big Picture with Kal Penn is a documentary series on the National Geographic Channel hosted by Kal Penn. It has aired twelve episodes since its debut on 30 March 2015.

References

External links 

 

2010s American documentary television series
2015 American television series debuts
American television series with live action and animation
National Geographic (American TV channel) original programming